In 2009 Đặng Nhật Minh's film Don't Burn (Đừng Đốt), starring Tina Duong, Minh Huong and Ben Rindner, about the martyr Đặng Thùy Trâm, premiered at the International 19th Annual took place in Fukuoka, Japan, winning the audience prize. The film was released in late April 2009 in Vietnam and showed at the ASEM international film festival in Hanoi in mid-May 2009. It was also the official selection for Vietnam for the Academy Awards.

Plot 
Don’t burn follows an American soldier by the name of Fred Whitehurst (Mathew M. Korsch) positioned year 1970-1972 in Vietnam during the Vietnam war. While attacking a village, Fred finds a diary in an abandoned field hospital. With the help of a fellow soldier Huan (Ben Rindner) he starts translating the diary, which belonged to Dang Thuy Tram (Minh Houng), a doctor who was positioned at the field hospital for several years. She describes in vivid detail the horrors she experienced during the war: her friends die around her every day, food is scarce, and she misses her family. As Fred continues to read about the horrific fate of the wounded soldiers Thuy treated, he starts to see the humanity of his enemy and starts to have nightmares of the people he and the US army have killed. Once Fred returns to the United States, his translation efforts continue with the help of his brother Robert Whitehurst’s (Brian Townes) Vietnamese wife Mai (Tina Duong). While the family’s long history of military service in the US army initially clashes with the empathetic writing of their supposed enemy, they eventually grow to be inspired by Thuy’s altruism. 35 years pass before Fred brings the diary to Texas Tech University for a seminar on the Vietnam war. There the diary is archived digitally and eventually returned to Thuy’s surviving family.

Production 
At the end of 2005, Dang Thuy Tram's diary became a phenomenon in Vietnam. After a visit to the family of martyr Dang Thuy Tram, the idea of making a movie about Ms. Tram began to form in director Dang Nhat Minh's mind. He wanted to make a Vietnam War film different from the ones made before in Vietnam, one where neither the "enemy" nor the "allies" sides were evil. The director expressed that "In the whirlpool of war, people are only victims".

Đặng Nhật Minh traveled to North Carolina in 2005 to meet Fred Whitehurst before writing the film. When asked what had impressed Fred most about the diary, he claimed it was the passage "Và ai có biết chăng ai/ Tình thương đã chắp cánh dài cho ta…" which translates to "And do you know/ Love has given us wings..." Returning to Hanoi, he began to write the script for the film, which was initially called "there is fire in this".

Cast 

 Minh Huong
 Tina Duong
 Michael Jarmus
 Mathew M Korsch
 Patrick T
 McGowan
 Ben Rindner
 Aryeh Sternberg
 Brian Townes

Awards 
The film won the Golden Lotus for Best Feature Film, the Award for Best Screenplay at the 2009 Vietnam Film Festival as well as the Golden Kite Prize and Excellent Director award by Vietnam Cinema Association Awards in 2009.

It also won the audience award at the 2009 Fukuoka Film Festival.

References

External links
 

2009 films
Vietnamese historical films
Films based on works by Vietnamese writers